Hastings-Quinte Paramedic Service is a rural ambulance service for Member Municipalities of Hastings County, including the Cities of Belleville and Quinte West, and also under contract to the Prince Edward County

Stations

Hastings-Quinte Paramedic Service consists of 6 stations and one post:

Hastings County
 Millennium Base/ Service HQ - Station 00: 111 Millennium Parkway, Belleville - GPS Coordinates: 
 Farley Base - Station 01: 38 Farley Avenue, Belleville - GPS Coordinates: 
 Quinte West Base - Station 02: 25 Frankford Crescent Unit 4, Bldg 58, Trenton  - GPS Coordinates: 
 Madoc Base - Station 03: 244 St. Lawrence Street West: Madoc - GPS Coordinates: 
 Bancroft Base - Station 04: 33B Chemaushgon Street, Bancroft, Ontario - GPS Coordinates: 
 Tweed Post - Post 06: 127 G River Street West, Tweed, Ontario - GPS Coordinates:

Prince Edward County
 Picton Base - Station 01: 12 MacSteven Drive, Picton, Ontario - GPS Coordinates:

Ambulance Helipads
Air ambulance for the province is provided by Ornge.

 The Madoc base has a helipad to provide air ambulance transfers.  
 Bancroft has a helipad for emergency transfers located at Bancroft Airport.  
 The Belleville helipad is located near the Belleville Hospital.

Rank
 Director / Chief
 Deputy Chief - Quality and Development
 Deputy Chief - Operations
 Superintendents
 Paramedic Team Leaders
 Paramedics - Advanced Care
 Paramedics - Primary Care

Fleet

 Type III ambulances: Crestline FleetMax Bodies, Chevrolet Van Chassis Cabs
 Supervisor Car - Ford Expedition SSV SUV, Ford F-250 Pickups, Ford Escape ERVs

See also

Paramedicine in Canada
List of EMS Services in Ontario
Paramedics in Canada
Emergency Medical Services in Canada

Emergency Services in Hastings & Prince Edward Counties
Ontario Provincial Police

External links
 H-Q EMS

Ambulance services in Canada
Hastings County
Prince Edward County, Ontario